Maianthemum monteverdense is a perennial flowering plant of restricted distribution. It grows as an epiphyte on trees in high cloud forests of 1600 m + elevation from Nicaragua to Costa Rica.

Description

Leaves
Leaves usually clasp the stalk or sometimes have a short, 1–2 mm long petiole. Veins are prominent and the leaf surface is hairless and shiny.

Flowering clusters
Forty to 60 flowers are set on a branched flowering stalk (panicle). The main axis of the panicle is usually 15–20 cm long, pendent and slightly flexuous. It is hairless, shiny and light green. The side branches of the panicle are short, spreading, set at about 1–2 cm intervals along the main axis and are arranged in a helix. Each side branch has 4-6 flowers, set on 1–2.5 cm long stalks (pedicels).

Flowers and fruits  
The flowers are cup-shaped and made up of yellow-green tepals 5-5.5 mm long and 2 mm wide. Stamens are inserted at the base of the tepals. Fruits are 3-lobed, 10–12 mm across, green ripening to red. Flowering occurs from December to February and fruits remain on the plant into August.

Distribution
Found in Costa Rica from the provinces of Alajuela, Cartago, Guanacaste, and Puntarenas and in Nicaragua from Jinotega departmento.

Habitat and ecology
Maianthemum monteverdense is an epiphyte that grows on canopy trees of cloud forests, but will persist in blow-downs under an open canopy. It is generally found at sites from 1600 to 1700 m elevation, but has been found at sites below 1000 m elevation in Nicaragua and up to 2300 m in Costa Rica.

Similar species
Maianthemum monteverdense is similar to Maianthemum amoenum. Both are epiphytes of cloud forests, but M. amoenum is a smaller plant with a shorter, erect flowering panicle with a red rather than green central axis.

References

Bibliography

monteverdense
Flora of Nicaragua
Flora of Costa Rica